Kazé is a French publishing company that specializes in anime and manga. Its head office is in the 9th arrondissement of Paris. Founded in 1994, the company debuted by publishing Record of Lodoss War on VHS. It is currently run by Sony through the EMEA division of Crunchyroll, LLC, a joint venture anime business between Sony Pictures and Sony Music Entertainment Japan's Aniplex.

After 15 years, Kaze became Kazé in 2010, in hopes that the addition of an accent allowed for a better pronunciation of its name. It published numerous series of Japanese animations in French and became one of the largest independent publishers of video and manga in Europe.

In 2005, Kazé launched its music label, Wasabi Records, specializing in J-Pop. In the last few years, the company has diversified its activities by publishing Japanese animated feature films, such as Appleseed, Origin: Spirits of the Past and The Girl Who Leapt Through Time. In 2007, Kazé released Shinobi, its first live-action film, to theaters in France, and in July 2009, Kazé launched its own television channel, KZTV (Kazé TV), devoted to anime.

On August 28, 2009, Kazé announced its acquisition by Viz Media Europe, a subsidiary of Shogakukan and Shueisha.

Prior to the purchase, the company's manga was published under the Asuka imprint. Since January 2010, only yaoi titles have been released under the Asuka imprint; the majority of titles were moved to the company's new Kazé imprint, including later volumes of non-yaoi series started under the Asuka imprint. Asuka's current licenses include a broad spectrum of manga: popular shōnen and shōjo series such as After School Nightmare, more mature seinen and josei titles such as Bokurano, and classic manga such as Black Jack and works by Osamu Tezuka. They also publish a number of yaoi and yuri titles, including a French edition of Be x Boy magazine.

The company also publishes in Germany, Italy, United Kingdom, Spain, Austria, Russia & Poland.

In May 2012, Cédric Littardi, the founder and long-time head of the company, announced his departure.

On June 1, 2022, Crunchyroll announced that Kazé and its labels will be rebranded as Crunchyroll. The change became effective on October 1, 2022.

Italian dubs 
In 2012, the French company has received criticism from Italy regarding the publication of Black Lagoon: Roberta's Blood Trail (series OVA), Mardock Scramble: the First Compression, and Children Who Chase Lost Voices. Instead of giving the job to an Italian dubbing studio, as with previous releases, Kazé opted for a French dubbing studio named Wantake, which used amateur voice actors of Italian-French nationality. The resulting performance was regarded as poor. Criticism was also directed towards the menu systems on the DVDs, which featured inaccurate translations. On Amazon.com, titles have received numerous negative reviews owing to these perceived failings, and the company was flooded with negative comments via Twitter and Facebook.

Anime published

Anime published in France

Appleseed XIII
Bleach
Yo-kai Watch

Anime published in UK

Bakuman (Sub-only release)
Berserk: The Golden Age Arc
Black Lagoon
Black Lagoon: Roberta's Blood Trail
Bleach (Movies 3 and 4, and Memories of Nobody)
Code Geass (Both seasons)
Future Diary
JoJo's Bizarre Adventure (Season 1 only)
Magi: The Labyrinth of Magic
Mardock Scramble
Mawaru Panguindrum
Nisekoi
Nura: Rise of the Yokai Clan
One-Punch Man
Persona 4: The Animation
Princess Jellyfish
Tiger & Bunny
Trigun: Badlands Rumble
Un-Go
World Conquest Zvezda Plot

Anime published in Germany

Attack on Titan
Cat's Eye
Fairy Tail
Inuyasha
Phantom Thief Jeanne
Sailor Moon
Yo-kai Watch

Anime published in Spain

Black Lagoon

Anime published in Italy

Hellsing Ultimate

Manga

Black Rose Alice
Initial D
The Promised Neverland
Jujutsu kaisen

Kazé Anime Nights 

Kazé Anime Nights is a cinema event, where Kazé screens anime films and sometimes Asian films across Germany and Austria for one day or multiple days.

Films of Kazé Anime Nights and Asia Nights 2018

Films of Kazé Anime Nights 2019

References

Anime companies
Crunchyroll
French companies established in 1994
Mass media in Paris
Publishing companies established in 1994
Publishing companies of France
Sony
Viz Media